Limapontia is a genus of gastropods belonging to the family Limapontiidae.

The species of this genus are found in Europe.

Species:

Limapontia capitata 
Limapontia depressa 
Limapontia nigra 
Limapontia senestra 
Limapontia zonata

References

Limapontiidae